Blondes is the debut full-length album by American electronic duo Blondes, released on February 7, 2012 by RVNG Intl. Critical reception was generally favorable, most notably that of Sean Adams, founder of Drowned in Sound, who lauded the album in a 10/10 review.

Track list

Disc 1

Disc 2

References

2012 debut albums